John Dornon (February 22, 1940 – January 14, 1996) was an American football coach.  He was the head football coach at Morningside College in Sioux City, Iowa. He held that position for three seasons, from 1974 until 1976. His coaching record at Morningside was 4–22–1.

Head coaching record

References

1940 births
1996 deaths
Morningside Mustangs football coaches
People from Harlan, Iowa